"Freedom" (stylized as FREEDOM!) is a song by Pharrell Williams which was released for streaming on Apple Music and played by Zane Lowe on his show on Beats 1 on its launch date of June 30, 2015. Part of the song was made available as a teaser on Williams' Twitter page and was also used in a promotional video for Apple Music. Its music video was nominated for Best Music Video at 58th Grammy Awards.

Critical reception
Writing for MusicSnake, Marissa Fitzgerald gave the song a very positive review, give it 4/5 stars and stating Freedom' is an awesome track with a feel-good vibe and a positive message. The lyrics are uplifting and promote living a happy life without restrictions or limitations." Rolling Stone describes the track, "powerful," as well as, "snappy," and, "infectious," while The Guardian describes it as, "socially conscious." According to USA Today, "Williams may have found a song that captures the tenor of its time."

Live performances
Williams performed the song on his international 2015 tour, including during his set at Glastonbury Festival 2015 on the Pyramid Stage on Saturday June 27. Williams also performed this single at the 2015 MTV Video Music Awards and the 2015 MTV Europe Music Awards. Williams performed the song on The Tonight Show Starring Jimmy Fallon on Friday September 11. Williams also performed the song with a full orchestra during a guest appearance at Hans Zimmer's live set at the Coachella Valley Music and Arts Festival on Sunday April 16, 2017.

In other media
In 2017, the song was used for an advert of the telecommunications company Claro by its subsidiary in Argentina.
In 2017, the song was used in the Nissan Navara commercial.
in 2016, the song was used in an Aetna commercial
in 2018, the song was used in a Bank of America commercial.
In 2017, the song appeared on the soundtrack for Despicable Me 3, which Williams also produces the music for the franchise.
In 2017 the song was in the Los Angeles bid for the 2028 Summer Olympics.
In 2017, the song was used for an advert of the Dutch energy supplier, Eneco.
In 2016, the song was played prior to the concession speech delivered by Hillary Rodham Clinton, the Democratic Party's candidate for President of the United States in the 2016 U.S. Presidential Election.
In 2016, the song was used in adverts for New Zealand telecommunication company, Spark.
In 2016, the song appeared in the movie, Now You See Me 2.
In 2015, the song was used for an advert of the German television transmitter, Sky Deutschland.
In 2019, the song was used in Walmart's new clothing ad for their We Dress America campaign.

Charts

Weekly charts

Year-end charts

Certifications

References

2015 songs
2015 singles
Pharrell Williams songs
Songs written by Pharrell Williams
Music videos directed by Paul Hunter (director)
Songs about freedom
Columbia Records singles
Indie pop songs
Song recordings produced by Pharrell Williams
Songs written by Treach
Songs written by Vin Rock
Songs written by KayGee